Deborah Ryan may refer to:

 Deborah Sugg Ryan, British design historian
 Debbie Ryan (born 1952), basketball coach
 Debby Ryan (born 1993), American actress and singer